(), also known as  in ancient times, is a traditional Chinese nuptial ceremonial rite where newlywed couples interlinking and crossing their arms to sip  from two separated cups to their future marital happiness, to promise their lifelong love and to make the vows of no separation in the presence of their guests. This nuptial ceremony can be traced back to the ancient times and already existed in the Qin dynasty; it is suggested that its earliest form had probably started in the late Neolithic period of China; since then, the rite was transmitted down from generation to generation. This ceremonial rite is still a common practice in Chinese wedding in present-day.

Origins and evolution 
Gourd ladles were the oldest form of  cups and were made by cutting a gourd in half. The bride and groom would hold a gourd ladle to drink the wine in the form of a  ceremony which would symbolizes a harmonious marital life and the promises the couple would never separate from each other.

See also 

 Confucian view of marriage
 Wedding reception in Chinese societies
 Traditional Chinese Wedding dress

Notes

References 

Marriage in Chinese culture
Confucian rites